"Russian Rag" is a 1918 ragtime jazz piano composition by George L. Cobb. The composition was published by Francis, Day & Hunter Ltd.

The composition is based on the opening chord progression of  Rachmaninoff's Prelude in C-sharp minor, Op.3, No.2. The piece was such a hit that Cobb wrote The New Russian Rag in 1923 in an attempt to arrange more of the Rachmaninoff prelude for ragtime piano.

Elena Kats-Chernin wrote another later piano composition entitled Russian Rag in 1996.

References

External links
 Russian Rag (Cobb, George L.) from IMSLP

1918 compositions
Jazz compositions in C-sharp minor
Piano compositions by American composers
Rags